In mathematics, the Chern–Weil homomorphism is a basic construction in Chern–Weil theory that computes topological invariants of vector bundles and principal bundles on a smooth manifold M in terms of connections and curvature representing classes in the de Rham cohomology rings of M. That is, the theory forms a bridge between the areas of algebraic topology and differential geometry. It was developed in the late 1940s by Shiing-Shen Chern and André Weil, in the wake of proofs of the generalized Gauss–Bonnet theorem. This theory was an important step in the theory of characteristic classes.

Given a principal G-bundle P on M, there is an associated homomorphism of -algebras,
,
called the Chern–Weil homomorphism, where on the right cohomology is de Rham cohomology.  This homomorphism is obtained by taking invariant polynomials in the curvature of any connection on the given bundle.  If G is either compact  or semi-simple, then the cohomology ring of the classifying space for G-bundles, is isomorphic to the algebra  of invariant polynomials:

(The cohomology ring of BG can still be given in the de Rham sense:

Definition of the homomorphism
Choose any connection form ω in P, and let Ω be the associated curvature form; i.e.,  the exterior covariant derivative of ω.

be the (scalar-valued) 2k-form on P given by

where vi are tangent vectors to P,  is the sign of the permutation  in the symmetric group on 2k numbers  (see Lie algebra-valued forms#Operations as well as Pfaffian).

First, that  is a closed form follows from the next two lemmas:

Indeed, Bianchi's second identity says  and, since D is a graded derivation,  Finally, Lemma 1 says  satisfies the hypothesis of Lemma 2.

To see Lemma 2, let  be the projection and h be the projection of  onto the horizontal subspace. As for Lemma 1, first note

which is because  and f is invariant. Thus, one can define  by the formula:

where  are any lifts of : .

Let  be arbitrary connection forms on P and let  be the projection. Put

Let  be the inclusions. Thus,  and  belong to the same de Rham cohomology class by the homotopy invariance of de Rham cohomology. Finally, by naturality and by uniqueness of descending,

Hence,  belong to the same cohomology class.

The construction thus gives the linear map: (cf. Lemma 1)

In fact, one can check that the map thus obtained:

is an algebra homomorphism.

Example: Chern classes and Chern character 
Let  and  its Lie algebra.

where i is the square root of -1. The k-th Chern class of a smooth complex-vector bundle E of rank n on a manifold M:

is given as the image of  under the Chern–Weil homomorphism defined by E (or more precisely the frame bundle of E). If t = 1, then  is an invariant polynomial. The total Chern class of E is the image of this polynomial; that is,

Directly from the definition, one can show that  and c given above satisfy the axioms of Chern classes. For example, for the Whitney sum formula, we consider

where we wrote  for the curvature 2-form on M of the vector bundle E (so it is the descendent of the curvature form on the frame bundle of E). The Chern–Weil homomorphism is the same if one uses this . Now, suppose E is a direct sum of vector bundles 's and  the curvature form of  so that, in the matrix term,  is the block diagonal matrix with ΩI's on the diagonal. Then, since  we have:

where on the right the multiplication is that of a cohomology ring: cup product. For the normalization property, one computes the first Chern class of the complex projective line; see Chern class#Example: the complex tangent bundle of the Riemann sphere.

Since , we also have:

Finally, the Chern character of E is given by

Then ch is a ring homomorphism:

Now suppose, in some ring R containing the cohomology ring , there is the factorization of the polynomial in t:

where  are in R (they are sometimes called Chern roots.) Then .

Example: Pontrjagin classes 
If E is a smooth real vector bundle on a manifold M, then the k-th Pontrjagin class of E is given as:

where we wrote  for the complexification of E. Equivalently, it is the image under the Chern–Weil homomorphism of the invariant polynomial  on  given by:

The homomorphism for holomorphic vector bundles 
Let E be a holomorphic (complex-)vector bundle on a complex manifold M. The curvature form  of E, with respect to some hermitian metric, is not just a 2-form, but is in fact a (1, 1)-form (see holomorphic vector bundle#Hermitian metrics on a holomorphic vector bundle).

Notes

References
 .
 .
 , . (The appendix of this book, "Geometry of Characteristic Classes," is a very neat and profound introduction to the development of the ideas of characteristic classes.)
 .
 .
 .
 .

Further reading 

Differential geometry
Characteristic classes